Defending champion Andre Agassi defeated Arnaud Clément in the final, 6–4, 6–2, 6–2 to win the men's singles tennis title at the 2001 Australian Open.

This was the first main-draw major appearance for future Tour Finals champion Nikolay Davydenko.

Seeds
The seeded players are listed below. Andre Agassi is the champion; others show the round in which they were eliminated.

  Gustavo Kuerten (second round)
  Marat Safin (fourth round)
  Pete Sampras (fourth round)
  Magnus Norman (fourth round)
  Yevgeny Kafelnikov (quarterfinals)
  Andre Agassi (champion)
  Lleyton Hewitt (third round)
  Tim Henman (fourth round)
  Juan Carlos Ferrero (second round)
  Wayne Ferreira (third round)
  Franco Squillari (second round)
  Pat Rafter (semifinals)
  Cédric Pioline (third round)
  Dominik Hrbatý (quarterfinals)
  Arnaud Clément (final)
  Sébastien Grosjean (semifinals)

Qualifying

Draw

Finals

Section 1

Section 2

Section 3

Section 4

Section 5

Section 6

Section 7

Section 8

External links
 Association of Tennis Professionals (ATP) – 2001 Australian Open Men's Singles draw
 2001 Australian Open – Men's draws and results at the International Tennis Federation

Mens singles
Australian Open (tennis) by year – Men's singles